The Umdanagar railway station is located near Shamshabad in Hyderabad, Telangana, India. Umdanagar is situated 6 km from Rajiv Gandhi International Airport, Hyderabad. The doubling and electrification of the 29.7 km section between Umdanagar- Shadnagar railway section was completed in 2022.

References

External links
MMTS Timings as per South Central Railway

MMTS stations in Hyderabad